Earlie Stancel Fires (born March 19, 1947, in Rivervale, Arkansas) is a retired National Museum of Racing and Hall of Fame jockey.

Fires began riding professionally in 1964 and led all American apprentices in wins that year with 224. He retired on September 21, 2008, having won 6,470 races at racetracks across North America. In 1983, and again 1987,  Fires set a record for Arlington Park by winning seven races in a single day of racing. He is Arlington Park's all-time leading rider with 2,886 wins and holds the record for most wins in that track's Lincoln Heritage Handicap with seven. He also has the distinction of riding in the Kentucky Derby after a 24-year hiatus, the longest gap for a jockey. He rode in the 100th Kentucky Derby in 1974 and returned to Churchill Downs in 1998, at the age of 51, to ride in the 124th Kentucky Derby.

In 1991, Fires was voted the George Woolf Memorial Jockey Award, given to a jockey who demonstrates high standards of personal and professional conduct, on and off the racetrack. He was inducted in the National Museum of Racing and Hall of Fame in 2001 and following its creation, the Chicagoland Sports Hall of Fame in 2007.  He retired in 2008.  

Earlie Fires' brother is trainer William H. Fires.

References

External links
 Earlie Fires at the United States' National Museum of Racing and Hall of Fame
 Earlie Fires at the NTRA

1947 births
Living people
American jockeys
United States Thoroughbred Racing Hall of Fame inductees
People from Poinsett County, Arkansas